 
Paw Paw Lake is a lake in Coloma Township and Watervliet Township in Berrien County, Michigan. The lake was the site of a tourist area in the early 20th century. This area became the census-designated place of the same name.

See also

List of lakes in Michigan

References

Further reading

External links
 The Paw Paw Lake Association

Lakes of Berrien County, Michigan
Lakes of Michigan